Van Andrew Davis Jr. (1921-1987) was a professional American football defensive end. He was a member of the New York Yankees of the All-America Football Conference.

References

People from Oglethorpe County, Georgia
New York Yankees (AAFC) players
American football defensive ends
Georgia Bulldogs football players
1921 births
1987 deaths